Take It to the Streets is the twelfth studio album from The Angels released on 31 August 2012. It reached No. 24 on the ARIA Albums Chart.

Track listing
 "To the Streets" (John Brewster, Nick Norton) – 4:26
 "Wounded Healer" (Rick Brewster) – 3:54
 "Waiting for the Sun" (J. Brewster, R. Brewster, Joe Burnham) – 4:48
 "Life Gets Better" (Dave Gleeson, R. Brewster) – 4:11
 "Telephone" (R. Brewster, Colin Coplin) – 6:28
 "No Sleep in Hell" (Doc Neeson, J. Brewster, R. Brewster) – 4:44
 "The More You Know" (J. Brewster, C. Coplin) – 3:45
 "When the Time Comes" (D. Neeson, J. Brewster, R. Brewster) – 3:03
 "Pump It Up" (Elvis Costello) – 3:21
 "There Comes a Time" (J. Brewster, C. Coplin) – 3:01
 "Small Price" (J. Brewster, R. Brewster, Brent Eccles) – 4:02
 "Getting Free" (R. Brewster, N. Norton) – 2:46
 "Some Kinda Hell in Here" (R. Brewster, N. Norton) – 4:55
 "Free Bird" (J. Brewster, N. Norton) – 3:37

"No Sleep in Hell" was originally on the album Watch the Red. "When the Time Comes" was originally on the album The Howling. "Small Price" was originally on the album Two Minute Warning.

Personnel 
 Bass, Backing Vocals – Chris Bailey
 Co-producer – John Brewster, Rick Brewster
 Drums, Backing Vocals – Nick Norton
 Guitar, Harmonica, Backing Vocals – John Brewster
 Lead Guitar, Piano, Organ – Rick Brewster
 Recorded By – Reyne House
 Vocals – Dave Gleeson

Charts

Notes 
Disc 1 - Additional guitar solos: Sam Brewster-Jones, Harry Brewster-Jones, Nick Norton
Disc 1 - Recorded at Alberts Studio, Neutral Bay, NSW, Australia
Disc 2 - Recorded live at QPAC Theater, Brisbane, Australia, 21 January 2012
Produced by John and Rick Brewster

References

2012 albums
The Angels (Australian band) albums